The 1905–06 Sheffield Shield season was the 14th season of the Sheffield Shield, the domestic first-class cricket competition of Australia. New South Wales won the championship.

Table

Statistics

Most Runs
James Mackay 559

Most Wickets
Jack Saunders 27

References

Sheffield Shield
Sheffield Shield
Sheffield Shield seasons